Badi Aouk (born 29 March 1995) is a Moroccan footballer currently playing for Wydad AC as a winger.

References

Moroccan footballers
Living people
1995 births
Association football wingers
Hassania Agadir players
Wydad AC players